The women's foil competition in fencing at the 2016 Summer Olympics in Rio de Janeiro was held on 10 August at the Carioca Arena 3.

Results

Finals

Top half

Section 1

Section 2

Bottom half

Section 3

Section 4

Results

References

Women's foil
2016 in women's fencing
Women's events at the 2016 Summer Olympics